Kevin Jean-Louis is a Mauritian goalkeeper who now plays for Pamplemousses SC and the Mauritius national football team, otherwise known as Club M.

Early life

His father a former footballer, Kevin Jean Louis was admitted into the St Francis Xavier Football School at age 11. Mentored by Marcel Guillaume, he chose to be a goalkeeper, equivalent to his father.
At age 17, he got an offer to go to Pamplemousses SC, which he accepted.

Club career

Mauritian goalkeeper Kevin Jean-Louis has attracted interest from two foreign teams: SS Saint-Louisienne in Réunion and FC Wohlen in Switzerland.

International career
Newly appointed French manager Alain Happe, successor of Didier Six chose Kevin Jean-Louis to be included in the squad for the 2017 Africa Cup of Nations qualification rounds in which there were formidable national squads such as Ghana

Personal life

Kevin is an avid fan of Manchester United F.C., and looks up to Manchester United goalkeeper David de Gea.

References

Mauritian footballers
Association football goalkeepers
Living people
1989 births
Mauritius international footballers